Man of Conflict is a 1953 American crime drama film directed by Hal R. Makelim and starring John Agar and Edward Arnold.

Plot
Industrial giant J. R. Compton and his partner son Ray clash over J. R.'s treatment of employees in the company's plants. J. R.'s rise to success has taken his sense of fairness, and Ray must show his father how to conduct his affairs with respect for the men who work for them.

Cast

 Edward Arnold as J. R. Compton
 John Agar as Ray Compton
 Susan Morrow as Jane Jenks
 Fay Roope as Ed Jenks
 Herbert Heyes as Evans
 Dorothy Patrick as Betty
 Bob Carson as Official
 Russell Hicks as Murdock
 John Hamilton as Cornwall
 Lovyss Bradley as Miss Garner

References

External links

Man of Conflict at TCMDB

1953 films
American drama films
Films scored by Albert Glasser
1953 drama films
1950s English-language films
1950s American films